Willamette High School, or "Wil-Hi", is located in the Bethel-Danebo area of West Eugene, Oregon, United States. It is one of two high schools in the Bethel School District along with Kalapuya High School.

History
Willamette High School first opened to students on September 26, 1949. The opening of Bethel School District's only comprehensive high school was the culmination of a process that began on April 9, 1948. On this date, the rural Lane County, Oregon communities of Bethel, Clear Lake, Danebo and Irving passed a measure to consolidate and build the high school. A  school site was purchased on May 17, 1948. Funding was provided by bond levies passed on May 11, 1948, and October 20, 1948. In November 2012, Bethel voters approved a $10 million science wing. In 2022 a new $3 million CTE building was approved for classes like graphic design,photography and kitchen type classes to take place.

Academics
In 2008, 79% of the school's seniors received a high school diploma. Of 316 students, 251 graduated, 37 dropped out, five received a modified diploma, and 23 were still in high school in 2009.  In 2021 Willamette students achieve record setting graduation rates. Willamette’s 2021 four-year senior cohort graduation rate of 90.3% was 10% higher than the state average.

Willamette High School is noted for its vocational education, in addition to college prep, as featured on NPR.

Athletics
The Willamette girls' basketball team won the 5A state girls' basketball championship in 2007, 2009, and 2013.

In 1985 the boys' track team won the State Championship

In 1985 the varsity rally squad won the State Championship.

In 1957 and 1958 the cross country team won state titles.

Wolverine Stadium
Willamette's Wolverine Stadium was completely rebuilt after being burned down on August 2, 2003. The new stadium includes an artificial turf field.

Notable alumni
 Brandon Beemer, 1998, actor and model, The Bold and the Beautiful
 Mickey Loomis, 1974, general manager of the New Orleans Saints
 Quintin Mikell, football player, Philadelphia Eagles
 Curtis Salgado, 1971, blues musician, who inspired John Belushi to form the Blues Brothers

External links
 2013 Willamette High School promotional video on vimeo
 Willamette Newsletter
 Willamette's College and Career Center
 Willamette Pride Facebook page

References

High schools in Lane County, Oregon
Education in Eugene, Oregon
International Baccalaureate schools in Oregon
Educational institutions established in 1949
Public high schools in Oregon
1949 establishments in Oregon